Indane or indan is an organic compound with the formula C6H4(CH2)3.  It is a colorless liquid hydrocarbon.  It is a petrochemical, a bicyclic compound.  It occurs at the level of about 0.1% in coal tar.  It is usually produced by hydrogenation of indene.

Derivatives
Derivatives include compounds such as 1-methylindane and 2-methylindane (where one methyl group is attached to the five carbon ring), 4-methylindane and 5-methylindane (where one methyl group is attached to the benzene ring), and various dimethylindanes.  Other derivatives can be obtained indirectly, e.g. the reaction of diethyl phthalate with ethyl acetate, using metallic sodium and ethanol as a catalyst. The reaction yields indanedione ethyl ester, which can react with the sodium ions yielding a salt. This can be reversed by adding an aqueous solution of hydrochloric acid.

A family of indane derivatives are empathogen-entactogens. They are very close derivatives of other empathogen-entactogens such as MDMA and MDA. Examples include MDAI and MDMAI. Nichols also created an indane isomer of amphetamine, 2-aminoindane, NM-2-AI, and an iodized derivative 5-IAI.

See also
 Indene
 1,3-indandione

References